The Great Locomotive Chase is a 1956 American adventure western film produced by Walt Disney Productions, based on the Great Locomotive Chase that occurred in 1862 during the American Civil War. Filmed in CinemaScope and in color, the film stars Fess Parker as James J. Andrews, the leader of a group of Union soldiers from various Ohio regiments who volunteered to go behind Confederate lines in civilian clothes, steal a Confederate train north of Atlanta, and drive it back to Union lines in Tennessee, tearing up railroad tracks and destroying bridges and telegraph lines along the way.

Written and produced by Lawrence Edward Watkin and directed by Francis D. Lyon, the 85-minute full-color film also features Jeffrey Hunter, John Lupton, Kenneth Tobey, Don Megowan, and Slim Pickens. Paul J. Smith composed the score. Filmed in Georgia and North Carolina, along the now abandoned Tallulah Falls Railway, it was released in U.S. theaters by Buena Vista Distribution Company on June 8, 1956, and capitalized on Parker's growing fame as an actor from his portrayal of Davy Crockett. The film reteamed him with Jeff York, who had portrayed Mike Fink in the 1954-1955 Davy Crockett miniseries.

Plot
On March 25, 1863, Cpl. William Pittenger, along with seven other soldiers, are summoned to the US War Department and are brought before War Secretary Edwin Stanton to receive the first Medals of Honor. Pittenger, narrating, tells the story of the mission they participated in through a flashback.

In April 1862, Pittenger and several other soldiers, including William Campbell are posted outside Nashville under orders from General Mitchell. Andrews rides in to speak to Mitchell, who assigns him the mission of hijacking a train behind Confederate lines and destroying the bridges along the Western and Atlantic Railroad in order to delay reinforcements against Mitchell's planned attack on Chattanooga, as well as cripple the Confederate army's supply lines; possibly putting an end to the war. Pittenger, Campbell, and several more soldiers meet Andrews the next night on a hillside where he explains the mission, and tells them to arrive in Marietta, Georgia by April 10. Over the next few days the men make their way south through Confederate territory in small groups so as not to draw suspicion. Pittenger and Campbell rendezvous with Andrews and two others at an inn on the Tennessee River, but heavy rain causes Andrews to delay the attempt for a day.

On the morning of April 12, Andrews and the raiders congregate in a railroad hotel in Marietta. They board a northbound train, pulled on that day by a locomotive named the General, waiting for the breakfast stop at Big Shanty. While on the train Andrews is approached by the conductor William A. Fuller, who is suspicious about Andrews and the men he boarded with. Andrews shows Fuller a letter from Brigadier General Beauregard. This convinces Fuller that Andrews and his men are Confederate agents. While the passengers and crew are eating, Andrews and the men drop the passenger cars, hijack the engine, and proceed north. Witnessing this, Fuller pursues them on foot along with engineer Jeff Cain and foreman Anthony Murphy. Andrews and the men continue on, pulling up track to block any trains from the south and cutting telegraph wires to stop any towns ahead of them from being alerted. Fuller and his men continue to pursue the raiders; first on foot, then by handcar, then on the small yard engine Yonah.

The raiders make their scheduled stop at Kingston to wait for a southbound freight train. Andrews disguises their mission from the suspicious station staff by claiming that he's running an extra ammunition supply train to Beauregard. Once the southbound train arrives, the raiders  learn, to  their surprise, that Mitchell had captured Huntsville ahead of schedule and the Confederates are now running extra freight trains down south, including another train coming in from the north unscheduled. After 45 minutes of extra waiting, the last train arrives, and the raiders continue north. Shortly afterward, Fuller and his men reach Kingston. After alerting the station master of the situation, Fuller and  his men take a locomotive, the William R. Smith, waiting on the side track and continue until they reach another section of removed track. Fuller and Murphy then wave down Pete Bracken and his southbound express freight and they continue the chase with his engine, the Texas running in reverse.

The raiders make several attempts to stop their pursuers but barely manage to even slow them down. The raiders arrive at the first bridge and attempt to burn it down by lighting a boxcar and setting the brake it so as to prevent it from being moved. Fuller manages to disable the brake and the Texas pushes the car out, leaving the bridge intact. With the General out of wood and water and unable to continue, Andrews decides to stop and fight. However, before they can, Confederate cavalry from Ringgold approach; sent by General Leadbetter after Fuller managed to get a telegraph sent ahead of the raiders. Fuller arrives and reclaims his train as the raiders, having failed in their mission, flee into the wilderness and try to make it back home.

Over the next week, the raiders are hunted down and captured. The group is transferred from jail to jail across the south, ultimately learning that they have been found guilty and are to be hanged soon. One day, while in their cell in Atlanta, one of them manages to break the group's chains. They plan to escape the next morning. All men make it over the wall of the jail yard except Andrews and Campbell, who stay behind to fight off their captors. Eight of the raiders, including Pittenger, manage to escape while the rest are recaptured. Before his execution, Andrews requests a final visit from Fuller, who begrudgingly shows up. Andrews expresses hopes that Fuller will not hold a grudge for deceiving him, acknowledging that they both fought in their own ways. Andrews laments that he won't live to see the end of the war, when both sides come together and shake hands. He asks Fuller if they could do so instead. Fuller obliges, marking the end of their war and putting Andrews at peace.

Returning to the opening scene, Secretary Stanton tells the eight surviving raiders that their perished comrades will also receive the Medal of Honor posthumously, with the exception of Andrews who is ineligible due to being a civilian operative (also excluding William Campbell). Pittenger then thanks Stanton on behalf of all of the raiders, ending the film.

Cast

 Fess Parker as James J. Andrews, Union spy and leader of the volunteers
 Jeffrey Hunter as William A. Fuller, conductor of the Confederate train
 Jeff York as William Campbell, Union civilian Volunteer 
 John Lupton as Cpl. William Pittenger, Union soldier
 Eddie Firestone as Robert Buffum, Union soldier
 Kenneth Tobey as Anthony Murphy, Confederate railroad superintendent
 Don Megowan as Marion A. Ross, Union soldier
 Claude Jarman, Jr. as Jacob Parrott, Union soldier, first Medal of Honor recipient
 Harry Carey, Jr. as William Bensinger, Union soldier
 Leonard P. Geer as James A. Wilson (as Lennie Geer), Union soldier
 George Robotham as William Knight, Union soldier/civilian train engineer/fireman
 Stan Jones as Wilson W. Brown, Union soldier/civilian train engineer/fireman
 Marc Hamilton as John Wollam, Union soldier
 John Wiley as John M. Scott, Union soldier
 Slim Pickens as Pete Bracken
 Morgan Woodward as Alex, a Confederate soldier singing on troop train
 W.S. Bearden as Switchman 
 Harvey Hester as Jess McIntyre 
 Chuck Roberson as Confederate Prison Captain (uncredited)
 Dick Sargent as Unnamed Union soldier (uncredited)
 Dale Van Sickel as Alonzo Martin (uncredited)

Production

Location
By the 1950s the Western and Atlantic Railroad tracks where the Chase took place in 1862 were a modernized main line of the Nashville, Chattanooga and St. Louis Railway (now CSX), and unsuitable as background for a Civil War era film. The Disney studios looked about fifty miles east to the Tallulah Falls Railway, a somewhat decrepit but scenic shortline with photogenic curves and several wooden trestles. The film was shot at various points along the 35 miles between Franklin, North Carolina and Cornelia, Georgia.

Locomotives and rolling stock

The first of three locomotives commandeered by conductor William A. Fuller, the Yonah, was portrayed in the movie by the Lafayette, a 1927-built 4-2-0 replica of an identical locomotive of the same name built in 1837.  The original Yonah, however, did not have a 4-2-0 design, but was a 4-4-0 design that pre-dated the newer 4-4-0 designs of the other locomotives involved in the Chase.
 
Two of the locomotives used in the actual Chase had been preserved, though were not in working order. In 1956, the General was on display at Chattanooga Union Station, and the Texas was at the Atlanta Cyclorama. It would have been too costly to make them safely operational, but fortunately Disney had access to two working 4-4-0's of nearly identical appearance, both movie veterans: The William Mason  and Inyo. For the film, with changes to the paintwork the William Mason became the General, and Inyo served as both the Texas and the William R. Smith.

Disney rented the Inyo from Paramount Studios, who owned it at the time. Mason and Lafayette were rented from the B&O Railroad Museum, as were five Civil War era cars: Two coaches and a baggage car finished in bright yellow, and two iron ammunition cars. The studio also constructed five wooden boxcars which could be, and were, destroyed during the filming.

The locomotives today
As of March 2021, the two surviving locos from the chase, and the three which appeared in the film, were located as follows:
 The General is displayed at the Southern Museum of Civil War and Locomotive History in Kennesaw, Georgia.
 The Texas is displayed at the Atlanta History Center in Buckhead
 Lafayette,  (in the film as the Yonah) is displayed at the B&O Railroad Museum.
 The William Mason is also displayed at the B&O Railroad Museum.
 Inyo is displayed, and occasionally operated, at the Nevada State Railroad Museum in Carson City, Nevada

Songs
(In film sequence)
"Dixie"—sung by Fess Parker, et al.
"A Rebel I Will Be Until I Die"—sung by Morgan Woodward.
"Sons of Old Aunt Dinah" - lyrics by Lawrence Edward Watkin and music by Stan Jones, sung by Morgan Woodward, et al.
"I Stole A Locomotive Just to Take a Ride 'Cause My Daddy Was A Railroading Man"—sung by Jeff York, John Lupton, et al.
"Roll Jordan Roll, I Want To Go To Heaven When I Die"—sung by Fess Parker, et al.
"Tenting On the Old Camp Ground"—classic Civil War hymn sung by Fess Parker, Jeff York, John Lupton, et al.

Reception

The film received mixed reviews upon its release. Though given acceptable reviews by most critics, the film was not as successful as Walt Disney had hoped it would be. This may have been due to the anticlimactic ending, where the Union spies are captured, jailed, and attempt to escape. According to a review by Bosley Crowther of The New York Times, "The excitement is over when they abandon the trains." Moreover, some felt the film to be rather depressing or downbeat since the main characters are unsuccessful in their mission and some, including the lead character, wind up being executed.

Variety wrote, "It varies between good and fair entertainment values, with enough exciting passages to promise okay prospects at the box office." Harrison's Reports declared, "This Walt Disney historical melodrama should give fairly good satisfaction to the general run of audiences ... The action moves at a swift pace throughout, and is filled with many exciting, if incredible, situations before the raiders are caught." The Monthly Film Bulletin wrote, "Despite the lack of inventive incident, the story has a number of tense sequences, without, perhaps, rivalling the pace and gusto of Davy Crockett. The attempt to present both pursuer and pursued as equally attractive figures is highly successful, but this inevitably weakens the drama of the situation."

See also
 List of American films of 1956
 The General (1926 film)

References

External links
  
 
 

1950s historical films
1956 war films
1956 films
American Civil War films
American Western (genre) films
1956 Western (genre) films
American films based on actual events
American historical films
American war films
Films adapted into comics
Films directed by Francis D. Lyon
Films produced by Walt Disney
Films scored by Paul Smith (film and television composer)
Films set in 1862
Films set in 1863
Films shot in Georgia (U.S. state)
Films shot in North Carolina
Georgia (U.S. state) in the American Civil War
Rail transport films
Walt Disney Pictures films
Great Locomotive Chase
CinemaScope films
1950s English-language films
1950s American films